Nassim Oussalah (born October 8, 1981 in Béjaïa) is an Algerian footballer. He is currently playing for CA Batna in the Algerian Ligue Professionnelle 1.

Honours
 Won the Algerian League twice with JS Kabylie in 2006 and 2008
 Won the Algerian Cup once with JS Kabylie in 2011

References

1981 births
Living people
Algerian footballers
Algerian Ligue Professionnelle 1 players
CA Batna players
JS Kabylie players
Kabyle people
MO Béjaïa players
NA Hussein Dey players
Footballers from Béjaïa
MC El Eulma players
Association football forwards
21st-century Algerian people